January Col is a high col on the north side of Claydon Peak, Prince Andrew Plateau, Antarctica. When the New Zealand southern party of the Commonwealth Trans-Antarctic Expedition (1956–58) approached from New Year Pass they were able to gain a view of the mountains to the north and east, and they so named the col because they climbed it in January 1958.

References

Mountain passes of the Ross Dependency
Shackleton Coast